Danielle Ryan Chuchran (born June 9, 1993) is an American actress. She starred in the Christmas film Christmas for a Dollar as Verma and starred in the 2007 film The Wild Stallion (formerly Last of the Mustangs).

Career
She landed her first two auditions and filmed two movies for the Church of Jesus Christ of Latter-day Saints. At the age of eight she co-starred in Little Secrets, a feature film with Vivica A. Fox, Evan Rachel Wood and Michael Angarano. Shortly thereafter she landed the role of Thing 1 in The Cat in the Hat feature. In 2007 she also starred as one of the children in Saving Sarah Cain as Anna Mae Cottrell.

Additional credits include the HBO movie Shot in the Heart and episodes of several TV series, among them Crossing Jordan, Girlfriends, Days of Our Lives and The District. On stage she appeared in the production of Elvis and Juliet, written by Mary Willard and directed by Ted Lange.  She also appeared on The Bold and the Beautiful as a young Stephanie Forrester in flashbacks.

Filmography

Film

Television

References

External links
 

American child actresses
American film actresses
American television actresses
Living people
People from Upland, California
21st-century American actresses
Actresses from California
1993 births